is a Japanese anime illustrator, and character designer, and producer.

Anime involved in
Air movie: Producer
Angelium: Character Design (ep. 1)
Death Note: Animation director
Kanon: Producer
Kiddy Grade: Eyecatch Illustration (ep 13)
Magical Kanan: Character Design
Naruto Shippuden: Animation director for episodes 279, 287, 298

References

External links

 

Japanese illustrators
Anime directors
Living people
Year of birth missing (living people)